is a Japanese actor in the Tokusatsu genre. He is best known for being Kamen Rider Delta in Kamen Rider 555, and Shou Tatsumi/Go Green in the 1999 Super Sentai Series Kyuukyuu Sentai GoGo-V, and reprised his role in the Sentai Teamup Special Timeranger vs. GoGo-V and Gokaiger. He was also involved in a band with GoGo-V co-star Masashi Taniguchi called [G]. In 2012, he worked with the Aimachi Marching Band on their 50th anniversary concert event Evolution where he served as a Story Teller.

Filmography
 GTO: Great Teacher Onizuka (1998; live-action TV drama) – Shinichi Tohgo – Debut role
 Kyuukyuu Sentai GoGo-V (1999; tokusatsu) – Shou Tatsumi/Go Green
 Kamen Rider 555 (2003; live-action TV) – Shuji Mihara / Kamen Rider Delta
Kaizoku Sentai Gokaiger (2011-2012; Tokusatsu) - Shou Tatsumi/GoGreen (Cameo)

References

 Book references

External links 
 
 

Japanese male film actors
Japanese male stage actors
Japanese male television actors
1978 births
Actors from Aichi Prefecture
Living people
People from Handa, Aichi
20th-century Japanese male actors
21st-century Japanese male actors